The 1978 Grand Prix d'Automne was the 72nd edition of the Paris–Tours cycle race and was held on 1 October 1978. The race started in Blois and finished in Montlhéry. The race was won by Jan Raas.

General classification

References

1978 in French sport
1978
1978 Super Prestige Pernod